The Lithuanian Red Cross was founded in 1919. It was reestablished after the collapse of the Soviet Union. The Seimas, the Lithuanian parliament, passed a Red Cross law in 2000. The society has its headquarters in Vilnius, the capital of Lithuania. 

The society's departments include: the Financial Department, the First Aid Training Department, the Humanitarian Aid Department, the International Humanitarian Law Department, the Refugee Department, the Social Welfare Department, the Tracing Department, and the Youth Department.

References

External links
Lithuanian Red Cross (in Lithuanian)
IFRC's Operations in Lithuania (in English)
2021 Lithuanian Red Cross Society Monitoring Report

1919 establishments in Lithuania
Red Cross and Red Crescent national societies
Medical and health organizations based in Lithuania
Organizations established in 1919
Organizations based in Vilnius

lt:Raudonasis kryžius